The Mercury S-55 is a full-size car that was marketed by the Mercury division of the Ford Motor Company during the 1960s.  Developed as a performance-oriented version of the mid-level Mercury Monterey, the S-55 was the largest vehicle of the Mercury "S" (Special) range introduced in 1962; its Ford equivalent was the Ford Galaxie 500XL and competed in the full-size luxury sport coupe market segment against the Chrysler 300H.

As consumer buying habits in full-size sedans shifted in the late 1960s, performance-oriented vehicles such as the S-55 fell out of favor, with personal luxury coupes and muscle cars taking its place.  After the 1967 model year, the S-55 was discontinued; its role was largely taken over by the 1969 Mercury Marauder, produced until 1970.

Mercury S (Special) Series 
For the 1962 model year, to maintain interest in the Ford and Mercury product lines, Ford Motor Company introduced performance-oriented trim packages for both divisions.  Mercury introduced the S (Special) line of sub-models.  While the S-22 Comet and S-33 Meteor consisted primarily of exterior trim, badging, bucket seats, and floor-mounted shifters, the S-55 (based on the Monterey) offered the same interior features along with a higher-performance powertrain.

First generation (1962–1963)

For 1962, the Mercury S-55 was introduced alongside the Mercury Monterey.  A performance-oriented variant, the S-55 offered an interior with bucket seats, center console, a floor-mounted shifter, and special wheel covers.  As with the Ford Galaxie 500XL, the S-55 was produced in two-door hardtop and convertible bodystyles.  The S-55 was powered by the two largest engines available in the Monterey, a 390 cubic-inch V8 (300 or 330 hp) or a 406 cubic-inch V8 (385hp or 405hp).  The triple-carbureted version of the 406 was a special-order engine, tested at over 95 mph in the quarter mile according to Road & Track in a road test. The hardtop was listed at US$3,488 ($ in  dollars ) and 2,772 were sold.

For 1963, the S-55 model line was expanded, with its availability now including four-door hardtops. The previous notchback roofline was discontinued and buyers now were able to choose the "Breezeway" ( a reverse-slant retractable rear window) or the "Marauder" (fastback hardtop).  As with other Ford Motor Company vehicles, the S-55 saw its 406 V8 replaced by a 410hp 427 cubic-inch V8; the 425hp 427 (largely a racing engine) was a special-order option.  

For the 1964 model year, the S-22, S-33, and S-55 were discontinued.  In its full-size line, performance-oriented sedans remained with the 390 and 427 engines, Marauder fastback roofline, and bucket seats and console interior trim became extra cost options known as the " Sports Package "  for the luxury-oriented Park Lane  2 door models and 4  door Marauder models only.

Second generation (1966–1967)

For the 1966 model year, the S-55 made its return as a stand-alone model (becoming the only S model to make a return).   As in 1962, the model lineup consisted solely of two-door hardtops and convertibles.  Again based on the Monterey, the S-55 featured a bucket-seat interior with a floor-mounted shifter and a higher-performance powertrain.  Styling accents include unique body side-striping, deluxe wheel covers and the distinctive S-55 emblem on rear quarter panel and 428 V-8 emblem on the front fender sides.  As with the previous generation the retail price and number of hardtops made was similar at US$3,292 ($ in  dollars ) with 2,916 sold. 

In place of the 390 and 427 V8 engines, the 1966 S-55 was powered by a single engine.  A 345hp ''Super Marauder'' 428 cubic-inch V8 was paired to a 4-speed manual transmission or 3-speed ''Merc-O-Matic" automatic transmission. This was the same engine that powered the Ford Galaxie 500 7-Litre of the same year.

For 1967, poor sales of the S-55 demoted the model to become the "S-55 Sports Package".  The Mercury full-size line saw a major exterior update, changing its flat-fendered sides to a more rounded shape.  During the model year, the S-55 Sports Package would be dropped; the division would concentrate its two-door efforts on the smaller Mercury Cougar and more luxurious Mercury Marquis.  In various forms, the Cougar and Marquis would become the two most successful nameplates ever sold by the Mercury brand.

S-55 Data Sheet / Statistics

References

 

S-55
1960s cars
Rear-wheel-drive vehicles
Full-size vehicles
Cars introduced in 1962
Convertibles
Coupés
Sedans
Motor vehicles manufactured in the United States